Alonzo Williams is an American DJ and former member and promoter of the World Class Wreckin' Cru. He is credited for playing a major role in the development of West Coast Hip Hop, tracing back to the late 1970s. He is also the former owner of Kru-Cut Records.

World Class Wreckin' Cru
World Class Wreckin' Cru debuted in a club owned by one of the early West Coast DJs, Alonzo Williams. Before he opened "Eve After Dark" in 1979, Alonzo being one of the most popular DJs in the Los Angeles area. He began producing dances under the name of Disco Construction, named after funk group Brass Construction. Seeing the popularity of this new craze, he entered the market of running nightclub performances. The club opened with Detroit-born Andre Manuel aka Unknown DJ directing the music program whose main influence derived from an east coast flavour, Soulsonic Force, Orbit and Scorpio.

As the 1980s arrived, so did electronic funk, sampling drum beats fused with old school rap format. Disco Construction created a sub group called the  into Wreckin' Cru which were the Lonzos roadies and later adding World Class it became the name of the recording group. Lonzo hired local DJs Antoine "Yella" Carraby and Andre "Dr. Dre" Young who later became the original Mix Masters for KDAY. After being signed to CBS records Lonzo was asked if he had any other acts. After seeing Dre's cousin Jinx' group perform in a rap contest, a teenage group called C.I.A. (Cru' In Action) starring O'Shea "Ice Cube" Jackson, Dre’s cousin Tony ‘Sir Jinx’ Wheaton and Darrell ‘K-Dee’ Johnson, who with Dre would record a demo tape called "She's a Skag". The group was then signed to a single deal with CBS.

Before this happened, Wreckin' Cru performed in various shows around L.A. including opening for New Edition as well as multiple shows promoted by Lonzo.

The Wreckin Cru signed to CBS in 1986 along with CIA. After being released from CBS the WCWC went on to have their biggest hit ever "Turn off The Lights". WCWC was known as a dance and romance act with songs like Surgery, Juice, Cabbage Patch, Lovers and Turn Off The Lights.

References

Living people
American DJs
1957 births